John Gordon Wighton (22 July 1885 – 8 April 1924) was an Australian rules footballer who played with Geelong in the Victorian Football League (VFL).

Wighton was one of the victims of the sinking of the steamer Wyrallah in April 1924.

Notes

External links 

1885 births
1924 deaths
Australian rules footballers from Victoria (Australia)
Geelong Football Club players
Accidental deaths in Victoria (Australia)
Deaths due to shipwreck at sea